Leanne Taylor may refer to:

Leanne Taylor, musician in Twist (band)
Leanne Taylor (OITNB)